Staro Konjarevo is a village in North Macedonia. It is located close to the Bulgarian border in the Southeastern Region under the Municipality of Novo Selo.

Demographics
According to the 2002 census, the village had a total of 611 inhabitants. Ethnic groups in the village include:

Macedonians 611

References

Villages in Novo Selo Municipality